Anna Leong Brophy is a British comedian and actor.

Early life
Leong Brophy grew up in Brent, London. She is of Irish, Chinese, and Kadazan descent.

Career
Leong Brophy presents the Still Legit podcast with her comedy partner Emily Lloyd-Saini, with whom she has performed at the Edinburgh Festival Fringe as part of BattleActs! and EGG. She has also starred in TV series, video games, audiobooks, plays, and films.

In January 2022, it was announced that she is to play Tamar Kir-Bataar in the second season of Netflix's Shadow and Bone.

Filmography

References

External links 

Living people

Year of birth missing (living people)

21st-century Irish actors

British people of Irish descent
British actresses of Chinese descent
Kadazan-Dusun people